Punta Prieta is a desert town in the Mexican state of Baja California, on Federal Highway 1.

Parador Punta Prieta
A few kilometers north along Highway 1 is Parador Punta Prieta, where Highway 12 takes off to the east towards Bahía de los Ángeles and Punta La Gringa.

See also
Punta Prieta Airstrip

Notes
There are at least two places named Punta Prieta in Mexico. Punta Prieta, Baja California Sur, is a small town on the west coast of Baja California Sur.

References
 2010 census tables: INEGI

San Quintín Municipality